Mirwais Azizi (born 1962) is a Dubai based Afghan businessman. He is the founder and chairman of Azizi Group of companies which he founded in 1989 with a presence in realty, banking, investment, and hospitality. He is the chairman of Azizi Bank the largest commercial bank in Afghanistan, which he established in 2006 with $7.5 million in equity capital and has since reached up to $80 million.

He featured in the list of "Arabian Business 100 Inspiring leaders in the Middle East" in March 2018.

He is regarded by many Afghans as Afghanistan's richest man, who handled as much as 70% of the petroleum products sold
in Afghanistan, reportedly by Asia Sentinel. In 2010, WikiLeaks claimed, he is "possibly the richest man in Afghanistan".

Biography

Early life and education 
He was born in a family of the Azizi Pashtuns of Laghman, Afghanistan, who are a sub-clan of the larger Kheshgi tribe. He graduated in law from the University of Kabul. He left Afghanistan in 1988.

Career 
In 2007, Mirwais Azizi established Azizi Developments. In 2006, he founded Azizi Bank, now the largest commercial financial institution in Afghanistan. He also acquired Bakhtar Bank (now Islamic Bank of Afghanistan) which is one of the fastest growing banks in Afghanistan.

Azizi Developments started selling off-plan properties in Dubai until the global financial crisis struck. The majority of buyers could not continue payments and Azizi instructed that their deposits be handed back.

In 2013, Azizi Developments resumed the construction of projects. Presently, the company has more than 200 projects under various stages of development with a current portfolio Dubai valued over AED 45 billion.  His petroleum business Azizi Hotak Group, which was started with an initial investment of $80 million, operates in 10 countries.

He has served on the Board of Trustees for American University of Afghanistan, the first non-profit higher education institution in Afghanistan.

Companies 
List of companies/organizations owned by Mirwais Azizi;
 Azizi Investments
 Azizi Developments
 Azizi Bank
 Bakhtar Bank (now as Islamic Bank of Afghanistan)
 Azizi Hospitality
 Azizi Foundation

Personal life 
He is married to Parigul, with whom he has 7 children, including Farhad Azizi, Fawad Azizi, and Jawad Azizi.

See also 

 List of Afghans

Further reading

References

External links 
 Face to face: Mirwais Azizi, Azizi Developments on Arabian Industry

Emirati businesspeople
Afghan businesspeople
Living people
Emirati billionaires
Kabul University alumni
1962 births